The Mining and Gothic Museum (in German: Bergbau- & Gotikmuseum) in Leogang, Austria is dedicated to the documentation of late medieval sacral art in relation to the culture of mining. It possesses a collection of Gothic sculptures of the miners’ patron saints from the Alps region. This collection is unique throughout Europe.

The high quality standards of the museum are certified by the Austrian museum quality seal and the Museums Award 2003 of the State of Salzburg.

Collection
Since the foundation of the museum in 1992 the collection is increased by items on loan and new acquisition. 
The everyday life of the miners is depicted by the miner’s kitchen, Gewerkenstube and the Hoyerstube. The topic of the Hoyerstube is the displacement of 20 000 Lutherans, among them many miners, from the Archbishopric of Salzburg in 1731. The brothers Hans and Bartl Hoyer, the leaders of the Lutherans in the Pinzgau region, brought Leogang the reputation to be the “worst heretic hotbed”.

The collection exhibits more than 60 different minerals which are all found in the region The newest discovery is the so-called "Leogangite" which was only found in 2004.

The basement of the museum is home to a unique collection of sacred art, including the so-called “Beautiful Madonna”, a masterpiece of international Gothic. The sculpture was manufactured in Salzburg or Prague in 1410. The sculpture shows  a marked s-shaped curve in her posture, the robe smoothly draped around her body.  Mary and the child have almond-shaped eyes and a gentle smile, which are so typical for this style.

Likewise the collection also houses one of the rare "Madonnas on a Lion," depicting the Mother of God standing on a Lion. The meaning of this position has not yet been resolved.

A recently added rarity is a prayer-nut, it shows Emperor Maximilian and his first wife Mary of Burgundy.

Special exhibition
2009: Gothic discovering and preserving 
2011: Rudolf Leopold - The gothic-collector
2012: Mining and Art
2013: Gold and silver in the Archbishopric of Salzburg
2014: Madonnas on a Lion from Salzburg, Bohemia and Silesia

References

External links 
  

Mining museums in Austria
Museums in Salzburg (state)